Imantodes lentiferus, commonly known as the Amazon Basin tree snake, is a species of snake of the family Colubridae.

Geographic range
The snake is found in South America.

References 

Reptiles described in 1894
Imantodes
Snakes of South America
Reptiles of Bolivia
Reptiles of Brazil
Reptiles of Colombia
Reptiles of Ecuador
Reptiles of French Guiana
Reptiles of Peru
Reptiles of Venezuela
Taxa named by Edward Drinker Cope